Caitlin Elizabeth Carmichael is an American actress.

Life and career
Carmichael was born in Tifton, Georgia. She has appeared in a number television shows and films, including Shake It Up, iCarly, Hot in Cleveland, Law & Order: LA, Criminal Minds.

In 2011, she was nominated at the 32nd Young Artist Awards for the short film The Mis-Informant.

In addition to acting, Carmichael spends time taking dance classes (ballet, tap, and hip hop), as well as gymnastics. She also does volunteer work with the Beverly Hills Presbyterian Church, helping feed the homeless.

In 2012, at the 33rd Young Artist Awards, she was nominated for Best Performance as a Guest in a TV series in Shake It Up and also won Best Performance in a mini-series for her role in Bag of Bones.

 Carmichael attends the University of California, Los Angeles.

Filmography

Film

Television and web

References

Further reading

External links

21st-century American actresses
Actresses from Georgia (U.S. state)
American child actresses
American film actresses
American television actresses
Living people
People from Tifton, Georgia
Year of birth missing (living people)